Point Possession (Dena'ina: Tuyqun or Ch'aghałnikt) is a census-designated place (CDP) on the Kenai Peninsula in Alaska. According to the 2020 census, the CDP population was 9. Since 2009, Point Possession has been owned by the federal government and has been made a part of the Kenai National Wildlife Refuge.

Geography
The CDP is named for Point Possession, a landform on the northwest side of the Kenai Peninsula that marks the southern side of the mouth of Turnagain Arm into Cook Inlet. The Kenai Spur Highway enters the Point Possession CDP at the Swanson River and shortly dead-ends while still within the Captain Cook State Recreation Area; it leads southwest  to the city of Kenai. The rest of the CDP is accessible only via four-wheel-drive roads.

While the permanent population is three, the 2010 census counted 214 housing units.

Demographics

References

External links
 Alaska History and Cultural Studies
 Freepages
 The Conservation Fund
 USA.com

Census-designated places in Alaska
Census-designated places in Kenai Peninsula Borough, Alaska
Populated coastal places in Alaska on the Pacific Ocean